Star in the Hood EP Vol. 1 is the second extended play (EP) by recording artist Tinchy Stryder. It was released in June 2009 by Takeover Entertainment prior to the release of Stryder's second solo studio album, Catch 22. The EP is the first of a two-part free downloadable EP. Its cover art is a photo taken during the Catch 22 promo shoot.

Track listing

References

External links
 Tinchy Stryder - Star In The Hood EP Vol. 1. Grimepedia. 

2009 EPs
Tinchy Stryder albums
Takeover Entertainment EPs